Burtas (Burtasy; , Părtassem; ,) were a tribe of uncertain ethnolinguistic affiliation inhabiting the steppe region north of the Caspian Sea in medieval times (modern Penza Oblast, Ulyanovsk Oblast and Saratov Oblast of the  Russian Federation). They were subject to the Khazars.

History
Burtases had converted to Judaism in Khazar times and still practiced the Jewish faith in the 13th century.

They took part in a great Mongol–Russian battle at Kulikovo pole in 1380, on the side of the Mongols In the 1380s or earlier at least part of them settled in Temnikov Principality. The Tatar-speaking Burtashi ethnic group is sometimes mentioned in forums.

Ethnic Identity
The ethnic identity of the Burtas is disputed, with several different theories ranging from them being a Uralic tribal confederacy (probably later assimilated to Turkic language), and therefore perhaps the ancestors of the modern Moksha people.

Some scholars maintain that the Burtas are supposed to be Turkic-speaking and ethnically related with the Volga Bulgars.

Recently some scholars have suggested that the Burtas were Alans or another Iranian ethnolinguistic group. An Alanic (Sarmatian) origin would also explain their name as furt/fort ('big river' in Middle Iranian language or 'beehive' in Turkic language) and the Alanic endonym as.

Some Soviet and modern Russian historians such as A.E Alikhova and Gren connected the Burtas to the Chechens and noted that their neighbor Avars call them "Burti".

See also
Temnikov Principality — Medieval Turkic and Finnic state

References

Literature 
 
 

Jewish ethnic groups 
Historical ethnic groups of Russia
History of Penza Oblast
History of Ulyanovsk Oblast
History of Saratov Oblast